PacWest can refer to:

Pacific West Conference, an intercollegiate college athletic conference affiliated with NCAA Division II
Pacific Western Athletic Association, an intercollegiate college athletic conference affiliated with the CCAA
PacWest Bancorp, parent company of Pacific Western Bank in Los Angeles, California, United States
PacWest Center, a 29-story office building in Portland, Oregon
PacWest Racing, Bruce McCaw's Champ Car racing team in operation from 1993 to 2002
Pac-West Telecomm, a wholesale telecommunications carrier headquartered in Oakland, California
Pacific Western University (Hawaii), also called American PacWest International University, an unaccredited school in operation from 1988 to 2006.
 The Western Collegiate Athletic Association, a former NCAA Division I women's sports conference known as the "Pacific West Conference" in its final season of 1985–86